Apes of Wrath is a 1959 Warner Bros. Merrie Melodies animated short directed by Friz Freleng. The short was released on April 18, 1959, and stars Bugs Bunny. This cartoon recycles the plot from the 1948 cartoon Gorilla My Dreams.  The title is a parody of John Steinbeck's novel The Grapes of Wrath.

This cartoon was featured in Bugs Bunny's 3rd Movie: 1001 Rabbit Tales, but with a few slight changes, since the plot features Bugs and Daffy trying to sell books.

Plot
The cartoon opens with the drunk stork talking to himself in the woods about how everyone is always glad to see the stork and offering him drinks to celebrate the new baby, of which he can't refuse (not for obvious lack of trying.) Unbeknownst, the gorilla baby he is supposed to deliver walks out of his bag. The stork is shocked to find that he has no baby to deliver. He has to find that baby to deliver or he will be kicked out of the Stork Club.  Coincidentally, what scene should appear next... none other than Bugs Bunny, who is singing "I dream of Jeannie, she's a light brown hare..." while roasting a carrot not too far from him.  The stork knocks poor Bugs out with a stick and, dressing him up in baby clothes, takes him to the gorilla house as the new baby.

At the home, the gorilla couple are anxiously awaiting the arrival of their baby when the stork arrives. Elvis (the male) eagerly runs out and hands out bananas in lieu of cigars. The bag is closed and they are both excited, until they open the bag, which reveals Bugs. Disgusted by his looks, Elvis goes to get a club to hit Bugs with and supposedly put him out of his misery, but the mother (who is dubbed "Mama" throughout the episode) shrieks and stops him. Mama scolds him that "no matter what he looks like, he's still your son!" Bugs awakens, assuming by his headache and state of dress that he must have been to a costume party and gotten drunk with a hangover. However, upon hearing Mama call him her baby, Bugs figures out what's happening and, not about to assume position of a baby gorilla, tries to get away, only for the gorilla mother to respond by spanking him for trying to run. Elvis roars at Bugs when mother gorilla prompts him to "kiss your son," so she hits him over the head with a rolling pin to get him to stop scaring the "baby". Witnessing this, Bugs thinks this could be fun and decides to pretend to be a monkey.

From that point on, Bugs decides to make Elvis's life miserable for his own enjoyment as there is nothing Elvis can do about it. As Elvis rocks Bugs' cradle rather unpleasantly, he tries to sneak away from Bugs before the sneaky rabbit whines with a horrid tantrum for a drink of water, to which Elvis responds by dumping a bucket of water over him. The scene fades with Elvis still holding the bucket before it fades out just before the mother gorilla hits him with her rolling pin in response for his actions. The scene changes again and they're outdoors, where Mama tells Elvis to plays horsey with Bugs. Elvis plays for a few seconds then throws and sends Bugs flying up into the air, who then lands on Elvis and he begins chasing Bugs. To Bugs' best of luck, Mama is close by and soon takes control of the situation by confronting and clobbering Elvis with the ever-present rolling pin, Bugs doing the same while saying "bad ol' daddy" (almost like Tweety's famous line, "Bad ol' putty tat").

Later, Mama leaves Bugs in the care of Elvis once more, this time with Bugs continuing to hit Elvis constantly over the head with a baseball bat and babbling nonsensically. Mama walks away while saying, "That's nice, Elvis. Keep baby happy." Once she's gone, Elvis then takes the bat and breaks it in two, but Bugs cries out for Mama and Elvis decides to replace the bat for Bugs rather than letting Mama know what just happened. While this is occurring, the stork is back and already talking to Mama about his mistake, giving her their real baby. Elvis hears Mama yelling about the stork bringing their real baby, then gets a wicked grin upon finding out. Bugs finally realizes the danger that he is in (while meekly uttering the piteous line "Mother!") and tries to escape as Elvis gives chase. Bugs first tried to hide in the tree, but hiding in a tree proves fruitless when Elvis rips the tree up by its roots and is in hot pursuit once more. Then Bugs crosses a rope bridge and tries to keep Elvis at bay by threatening to cut it if he crosses it; Elvis instead pulls the entire opposing cliffside to him in one effortless yank of the rope. Elvis tries to hit Bugs when he shrugs it off, but he gets away, leaving Elvis to smash the cliff to rubble as Bugs runs around to the bottom of the cliff, thinking he's lost the mad gorilla. When Elvis sees Bugs at the bottom of the cliff from the top, he throws a huge boulder toward Bugs. Unfortunately this proven to be backfire as Bugs has no idea that there's a boulder coming towards him, but runs away when he sees Mama coming to ask "Elvis, guess what the baby said?" As such, she accidentally steps right into the spot where the boulder lands on her head hard then breaks into a rubble, much to Elvis' horror.

Elvis tries to explain to Mama about Bugs, but his words are too gibberish to be explainable and ends up sobbing in disgrace. Bugs witnesses it and says: "I'd like to see him eeh-ooh-aah-ooh and but his way outta this one," as Mama, finally had enough of Elvis' insane actions, begins to give him a sound thrashing with her rolling pin (off-screen). Suddenly, the stork mistakenly delivers a baby to Bugs. The baby turns out to be Daffy (with a goose egg atop his head suggesting parallels between Bugs' initial predicament). Daffy ends the cartoon by kissing and hugging Bugs and saying: "Mother! My dearest little mommy! Oh. I just love you, Mommy!" all to Bugs' noticeable annoyance and disgust.

Home media
"Apes of Wrath" is available, uncensored and uncut, on the Looney Tunes Super Stars' Bugs Bunny: Hare Extraordinaire and Looney Tunes: Unleashed DVDs. However, in both cases it was cropped to widescreen. It was also included in the Stars of Space Jam: Bugs Bunny DVD, but this time in the ratio in which it was originally animated (fullscreen aspect ratio).

References

External links

 

1959 films
1959 animated films
1959 short films
Animated films about gorillas
Short films directed by Friz Freleng
Bugs Bunny films
Daffy Duck films
Merrie Melodies short films
Warner Bros. Cartoons animated short films
Films scored by Milt Franklyn
1950s Warner Bros. animated short films